Captured is a mixtape by Jamaican dancehall artist Spice. It was self-released under Spice's own record label, Spice Official Entertainment, on 2 November 2018 via 21st Hapilos Digital.

Track listing
Sample credits

 "Under Fire" contains interpolations from "Under Water" by Vybz Kartel.
 "Romantic Mood" contains interpolations and samples from "Romantic Call" by Patra, "Kill the Bitch" by Sasha, "Uptown Top Ranking" by Althea & Donna, "Informer" by Lady Ann, "Bam Bam" by Sister Nancy and "You Don't Love Me (No, No, No)" by Dawn Penn.

Charts

Release history

References

Spice (musician) albums
2018 mixtape albums
Self-released albums